Kamalaśīla (Skt. Kamalaśīla; Tib. པདྨའི་ངང་ཚུལ་, Pemé Ngang Tsul; Wyl. pad+ma'i ngang tshul) (c. 740-795) was an Indian Buddhist of Nalanda Mahavihara who accompanied Śāntarakṣita (725–788) to Tibet at the request of Trisong Detsen. He is considered one of the most important Madhyamaka authors of late Indian Buddhism although little is known about his life aside from details left in Tibetan sources. Tibetan sources refer to him, Santaraksita and Jñānagarbha as rang rgyud shar gsum meaning the “three eastern  Svātantrikas” indicating their origins from Eastern India.

Lineage
Dargyay, et al. (1977, 1998: p. 7) convey a lineage of transmission and translation of Śīla, Sutrayana Buddhavacana and the Six Pāramitā (viewed principally through the Mahayana teachings of Nagarjuna), from India to Tibet (pandit in this context denotes a Sanskrit scholar):

Debate of Samye

In 793 Trisong Detsen resolved that Moheyan did not hold the true dharma. Following intense protests from Moheyan's supporters, Trisong Detsen proposed to settle the matter by sponsoring a debate, the "Council of Lhasa", although it may actually have taken place at Samye, a considerable distance from Lhasa. Kamalaśila was invited to represent Vajrayana while Moheyan represented the East Mountain Teaching of Chan Buddhism. Most Tibetan sources state that the debate was decided in Kamalaśīla's favour (though many Chinese sources claim Moheyan won) and Moheyan was required to leave the country and that all sudden-enlightenment texts were gathered and destroyed by royal decree. This was a pivotal event in the history of Tibetan Buddhism, which would afterward continue to follow the late Indian model with only minor influence from China. Moheyan's teachings were a mixture of the East Mountain Teachings associated with Yuquan Shenxiu and with the teachings of Baotang Wuzhu.

It is said that following his victory, Kamalasila was murdered by partisans of Moheyan's position in Tibet who killed him by squeezing his kidneys.

The Cham dance
There is a Cham dance that retells the story of the Council of Lhasa related to the teachings of Chöd. Moheyan is generally depicted as of ample girth, goaded by children. Chöd is a product of both the Indian and Chinese transmissions of Buddhism into the Himalayas. For a discussion of the Dunhuang fulcrum of the entwined relationship of Chinese and Indian Buddhism see van Schaik and Dalton (2004).

For simplicity, the Vajrayana transmission may be characterised as "gradual" (Chinese: dunwu) and the Chan as "direct" (Chinese: jianwu). It needs to be emphasised that this neat dichotomy in characterisation of these two approaches is only valid for the historical context of the great debate between Kamalaśīla and Moheyan and even then it is still open to dialectic.

According to the lore of the orthodox, prevailing Tibetan cultural tradition, Kamalaśīla, a scholar educated at Nalanda, advocated the "gradual" process to enlightenment; whereas, Moheyan, as a trance and meditation master, advocated the "direct" awakening of original mind through the nirodha of discursive thought, the cessation of the mind of ideation. The historicity of this debate has been drawn into question by Tucci & Heissig (1970), Gomez (1983) and Ruegg (1992) though this does not lessen its importance in defining the religious and cultural traditions of Tibet. Kamalaśīla was very handsome and a great orator and historically "won" the debate: though there are conflicting primary sources and secondary accounts.

One hagiography asserts that directly after this debate with Moheyan, as Kamalaśīla was making his way down from the Himalaya to the Indian lowlands, he was incited to enact phowa through compassionate duress, transferring his mindstream to animate a corpse polluted with a dangerous infection and thereby safely moving the hazard it presented to a nearby community. As the mindstream of Kamalaśīla was otherwise engaged, a mahasiddha by the name of Dampa Sangye came across the vacant body of Kamalaśīla. Padampa Sangye was not karmically blessed with an aesthetic corporeal form, and upon finding the very handsome and healthy empty body of Kamalaśīla, which he perceived as a newly-dead fresh corpse, transferred his mindstream into Kamalaśīla's body. Padampa Sangye's mindstream in Kamalaśīla's body continued the ascent to the Himalaya and thereby transmitted the Chöd.

The mindstream of Kamalaśīla, upon endeavouring to return to his body, was unable to do so and resorted by necessity to the vacant body of Padampa Sangye. The mindstream of Padampa Sangye continued in this body, and it is in this handsome body that the transmission of Chöd was made to Machig Labdrön, his consort.

Works

Trilogy of Stages of Meditation (bhāvanākrama)
Kamalaśīla is renowned for writing three texts, all called Bhāvanākrama (Stages of Meditation), which summarize and build upon aspects of the Yogacara tradition of Asanga, particularly as pertaining to aspects of meditation practice and mental cultivation (bhavana). The first volume was translated into Classic Chinese.

Commentary on Madhyamālaṃkāra
(Sanskrit: Madhyamālaṃkāra-panjika, Wylie: dbu ma rgyan gyi dka' 'grel)
Commentary on Difficult Points (Sanskrit: Madhyamālaṃkāra-panjika, Wylie: dbu ma rgyan gyi dka' 'grel) by Kamalaśīla

See also
Nagarjuna
Bhāvanākrama

Bibliography

Notes

References

Sources

 
Tucci, G. and Heissig, W. (1970). Die Religionen Tibets und der Mongolei. Stuttgart.

External links
 The Tattvasangraha (with commentary) English translation by Ganganatha Jha, 1937 (includes glossary)

Indian Buddhist monks
8th-century Buddhist monks
Indian scholars of Buddhism
Madhyamaka scholars
History of Tibetan Buddhism
Buddhist logic
Indian logicians
8th-century Indian philosophers
Scholars from Bihar
Monks of Nalanda